Frederick IV (before 30 November 1384 – 7 May 1440), nicknamed the Peaceful or the Simple (der Einfältige), was a member of the House of Wettin and Margrave of Meissen who ruled as the last independent Landgrave of Thuringia from 1406 until his death.

Life 
He was the son of Landgrave Balthasar of Thuringia and his first wife, the Hohenzollern princess Margaret of Nuremberg. His father had received the Landgraviate of Thuringia in the 1382 Division of Chemnitz and was able to largely extend his territories in several skirmishes with the local nobility. After the death of his first wife Margaret in 1391, he secondly married the Ascanian princess Anna of Saxe-Wittenberg.

Landgrave Balthasar planned to marry his son off to Elizabeth of Görlitz, a grand-daughter of the late Luxembourg emperor Charles IV; nevertheless, these attempts had already failed, when Frederick succeeded his father in 1406. One year later he married Countess Anna (d. 1431), the daughter of Count Günther XXX of Schwarzburg-Blankenburg. Their marriage remained childless.

Frederick is considered a relatively weak ruler, who was at times very dependent on the influence of his wife and her relatives.  To finance his lavish court, he sold more and more land and titles.  In 1436, he had all Jews expelled from Thuringia.

After Frederick's death without heirs, Thuringia was inherited by his two Wettin cousins, Elector Frederick II of Saxony and his brother William III. The succession led to the 1445 Division of Altenburg and the subsequent Saxon Fratricidal War.

Ancestors

References

External links 
 Entry in the Saxon Biography
 www.genealogie-mittelalter.de

Margraves of Meissen
Landgraves of Thuringia
House of Wettin
14th-century births
1440 deaths
14th-century German nobility
15th-century German nobility